It Is In Us All is a 2022 Irish thriller film written and directed by Antonia Campbell-Hughes. The film stars Cosmo Jarvis, Antonia Campbell-Hughes, Rhys Mannion, Keith McErlean, Claes Bang and Mark O'Halloran. The film premiered at SXSW on 14 March 2022.

Premise
A Londoner returns to his ancestral homeland of Donegal, Ireland and is drawn in by a teenager who almost kills him in a car crash.

Cast

 Cosmo Jarvis as Hamish Considine
 Rhys Mannion as Evan
 Antonia Campbell-Hughes as Cara Daly
 Keith McErlean as Gabriel
 Mark O'Halloran as Father Mark
 Lalor Roddy as Grandfather
 Pauline Hutton as Avis Receptionist
 Shashi Rami as Bradley
 Isaac Heslip as Riley
 Claes Bang as Jack Considine
 Peter Trant as Officer Kiely

Production
On 23 February 2020, it was announced that Jim Sturgess would star in Antonia Campbell-Hughes' directorial debut It Is In Us All.

Principal photography began on 14 October 2020, and concluded on 14 November 2020 in Donegal, Ireland.

References

External links
 

2022 films
2022 thriller films
Irish thriller films
English-language Irish films
2020s English-language films